Darreh Kayad Rural District is a rural district (dehestan) in Sardasht District, Dezful County, Khuzestan Province, Iran. In a 2006 census, its population was 1,840, in 316 families.  The rural district has 59 villages.

References 

Rural Districts of Khuzestan Province
Dezful County